Jacob Joseph Martin (born 11 May 1972) is an Indian cricketer. He is a right-handed middle-order batsman. Martin has appeared 10 times for India at One Day International (ODI) level at the turn of the 21st century. He captained Baroda cricket team in the Indian domestic circuit.

Domestic career 

Martin made his first-class debut for Baroda in the 1991–92 season in the Ranji Trophy. In his debut match, he took 5 wickets in an innings against Gujarat and scored a 50. However, Martin came to be regarded as a specialist batsman and an occasional part-time spin bowler — to date, he has a total of 9 first-class wickets including the 5 he took on debut.

He has played for Baroda throughout his career except during the 2002–03 season when he played for Railways. He has also captained Baroda on a regular basis from the 2000–01 season onwards, winning the Ranji Trophy in 2000–01 and finishing as runners-up the following season.

Martin's most prolific season was in 1998–99 when he scored 1037 runs for Baroda in the Ranji Trophy at an average of 103.70 including 5 centuries. The feat made him only the sixth player to have scored over 1000 runs in a Ranji Trophy season, and helped to earn him selection for the India national cricket team.

International career 

Martin made his ODI debut against the West Indies cricket team in September 1999, and also played in the subsequent triangular ODI series in Australia against Australia national cricket team and Pakistan national cricket team in January 2000. However, he was unable to reproduce his domestic form and did not play again for India after 2001.

Post-playing career 

He was named as head coach of Baroda cricket team for 2016–17 Ranji Trophy season.

He was arrested in 2011 in Delhi in connection with a 2003 human-trafficking case.

In December 2018, Martin was involved in a road accident and was placed on life support.

Martin is now retired and runs outlets of laundry and dry-cleaning brand, UClean, in Gujarat.

References

External links
 

1972 births
Living people
India One Day International cricketers
Baroda cricketers
Railways cricketers
West Zone cricketers
Indian cricketers
Assam cricketers
Central Zone cricketers
People from Vadodara
Indian cricket coaches
Wicket-keepers